The Honorary Title Pilot-Cosmonaut of the Russian Federation is a state award of the Russian Federation presented to all cosmonauts who fly for the Russian Federal Space Agency.  Usually accompanying the distinction is the title of Hero of the Russian Federation, the highest title that can be awarded to a Russian for performing heroic deeds while in service of the state.

History of the Title 
The Honorary Title of Pilot-Cosmonaut was originally established by Decree of the Presidium of the Supreme Soviet on April 14, 1961, it was then called Pilot-Cosmonaut of the USSR.  Following the dissolution of the Soviet Union in 1991, the title was retained by the Law of the Russian Federation 2555-1 dated March 20, 1992 and the title was renamed Pilot-Cosmonaut of the Russian Federation.

Award statute 
The Honorary Title "Pilot-Cosmonaut of the Russian Federation" is assigned by the president of the Russian Federation for the outstanding feat of space flight.  The insignia of Pilot-Cosmonaut of the Russian Federation is worn on the right side of the chest above orders and decorations.

Award description 
The Honorary Title "Pilot-Cosmonaut of the Russian Federation" is a 25mm wide by 23.8mm high convex pentagon with a gilt silver rim.  In the center is an image of the terrestrial globe with the territory of the Russian Federation enamelled in blue.  A gold star denotes Moscow as the point of origin of a gilt orbital path going around the globe once to reach a silver satellite at the upper left of the globe.  A second orbital path, this time enamelled in red, starts at the bottom center of the globe going up in an arc narrowing along the way to reach a gilt spacecraft above the globe.  Along the upper left edge of the pentagon above the globe, the gilt relief inscription "PILOT", along the upper right edge of the pentagon above the globe, the gilt relief inscription "COSMONAUT", along the bottom edge of the pentagon under the globe, the gilt inscription "RUSSIA", along the left and right lower edges of the pentagon, prominent gilt laurel branches.  The reverse of the insignia is plain except for the award serial number.

The insignia is secured to a standard Russian square mount by a ring through the suspension loop. The mount is covered by a silk moiré tricolour ribbon of white, blue and red.

List of recipients
The individuals listed below have all received the Honorary Title of Pilot-Cosmonaut of the Russian Federation:
 August 11, 1992, Decree no. 871 — Aleksandr Yurievich Kaleri
 February 5, 1993, Decree no. 181 — Sergei Vasilyevich Avdeev
 July 23, 1993, Decree no. 1060 — Aleksandr Fedorovich Poleshchuk
 January 14, 1994, Decree no. 154 — Vasili Vasilyevich Tsibliev
 August 18, 1994, Decree no. 1697 — Yuri Vladimirovich Usachev
 November 24, 1994, Decree no. 2107 — Yuri Ivanovich Malenchenko
 November 24, 1994, Decree no. 2107 — Talgat Amangeldyuly Musabayev
 April 10, 1995, Decree no. 338 — Elena Vladimirovna Kondakova
 September 7, 1995, Decree no. 907 — Vladimir Nikolaevich Dezhurov
 October 5, 1995 Decreo no. 1017 — Nikolai Mikhailovich Budarin
 April 1, 1996, Decree no. 447 — Yuri Pavlovich Gidzenko
 October 16, 1996, Decree no. 1443 — Yuri Ivanovich Onufrienko
 April 11, 1997, Decree no. 342 — Valeri Grigorievich Korzun
 April 10, 1998, Decree no. 370 — Aleksandr Ivanovich Lazutkin
 April 10, 1998, Decree no. 372 — Pavel Vladimirovich Vinogradov
 April 10, 1998, Decree no. 372 — Salizhan Shakirovich Sharipov
 December 25, 1998, Decree no. 1640 — Yuri Mikhailovich Baturin
 April 5, 1999, Decree no. 428 — Gennadi Ivanovich Padalka
 September 10, 1999, Decree no. 1211 — Valeri Ivanovich Tokarev
 November 9, 2000, Decree no. 1858 — Sergei Viktorovich Zalyotin
 April 9, 2001, Decree no. 408 — Boris Vladimirovich Morukov
 April 10, 2002, Decree no. 367 — Konstantin Mirovich Kozeev
 October 10, 2002, Decree no. 1145 (unpublished) — Yuri Valentinovich Lonchakov
 April 12, 2003, Decree no. 420 — Mikhail Vladislavovich Tyurin
 September 21, 2003, Decree no. 1082 — Fyodor Nikolaevich Yurchikhin
 February 4, 2004, Decree no. 140 — Sergei Yevgenyevich Treshchov
 February 23, 2005, Decree no. 206 (unpublished) — Yuri Georgiyevich Shargin
 Oleg Valeryevich Kotov
 February 5, 2009, (unpublished) — Sergey Alexandrovich Volkov
 February 5, 2009, (unpublished) — Oleg Dmitriyevich Kononenko
 April 12, 2010, Decree no. 449 — Roman Yurievich Romanenko
 October 30, 2010, Decree no. 1310 — Maksim Viktorovich Surayev
 April 12, 2011, Decree no. 432 — Oleg Ivanovich Skripochka
 April 12, 2011, Decree no. 433 — Mikhail Borisovich Korniyenko
 April 12, 2011, Decree no. 433 — Aleksandr Aleksandrovich Skvortsov
 March 3, 2012, Decree no. 270 — Dmitri Yuryevich Kondratyev
 June 25, 2012, Decree no. 904  — Andrei Ivanovich Borisenko
 June 25, 2012, Decree no. 904  — Aleksandr Mikhailovich Samokutyayev
 Awarded December 25, 2013 — Anatoli Ivanishin
 Awarded December 25, 2013 — Anton Shkaplerov
 May 28, 2014, Decree no. 374 — Oleg Novitskiy
 May 28, 2014, Decree no. 374 — Sergei Revin
 May 28, 2014, Decree no. 374 — Evgeny Tarelkin

See also

 Roscosmos Cosmonaut Corps
 Pilot-Cosmonaut of the USSR
 Honorary titles of Russia
 Awards and decorations of the Russian Federation
 Russian Federal Space Agency
 Baikonur Cosmodrome
 Astronaut badge

References

External links 
 The Commission on State Awards to the President of the Russian Federation
  The Russian Gazette

Honorary titles of Russia
Orders, decorations, and medals of Russia
Civil awards and decorations of Russia
Awards established in 1992